Barry Liebmann (December 4, 1953September 1, 2017) was a comedy writer whose work appeared in the pages of MAD Magazine for 38 years. Liebmann's subject matter was eclectic, ranging from sports to parental cliches to Harry Potter to cell phones to the Bible, but he wrote dozens of pointed Mad articles focusing on American politics.

He also worked for Looney Tunes comics.  In addition, he was an actor, appearing regularly with The Play's the Thing Theatre Company, Living Legends Radio Theatre, and with The NoName Players as "Beloved Intern Barry."

Personal life and career
Barry Liebmann was born in New York City, to Norbert and Dora Liebmann. His parents had left Germany and Austria after the 2nd World War started, while the US was still neutral and limiting refugees.   They lived in Washington Heights amongst other German Jewish prewar refugees and had a daughter, Ellen, in addition to Liebmann. Liebmann lived in the same apartment in Washington Heights, all his life, went to Queens College and graduated with a bachelor's degree and studied acting at HB studios. His sister Eleanor died in 1974, when Barry was in his early 20’s. Barry wrote for MAD magazine for almost 40 years, selling his very first piece to them when he was only 16 years old.  He also wrote for DC Comics' Looney Tunes and had pieces published in the NY Daily News, the New York Times, the Wall St. Journal. He performed in many theater groups including The Play’s the Thing Theatre Company, Instant Shakespeare, the No Name Players (as Beloved Intern Barry) and Living Legends Radio Theater; and he has acted in plays Uncle Vanya, the Comedy of errors, Our Town and A Night in Elsinore.

References

1953 births
2017 deaths
American comedy writers
American comics writers
American satirists
American parodists
American people of German-Jewish descent
Mad (magazine) people
Writers from New York City